Luisa Gago (born 8 November 1993) is a New Zealand rugby league footballer who played for the New Zealand Warriors in the NRL Women's Premiership. 

Playing career
A fullback as a junior, Gago transitioned into the forwards after a number of injuries. 

In 2017, while playing for the Manurewa Marlins, she was selected in the New Zealand squad for the 2017 Women's Rugby League World Cup, playing two games.

In August 2018, Gago joined the New Zealand Warriors NRL Women's Premiership team. In Round 1 of the 2018 NRL Women's season, she made her debut in the Warriors' 10–4 win over the Sydney Roosters, scoring a try.

On 22 June 2019, she captained Samoa in their first Test match in eight years, a 8–46 loss to New Zealand at Mt Smart Stadium.

References

External links
NRL profile

1993 births
Living people
New Zealand female rugby league players
New Zealand sportspeople of Samoan descent
New Zealand women's national rugby league team players
Samoa women's national rugby league team players
Rugby league locks
New Zealand Warriors (NRLW) players